George Lawson (14 August 1880 – 25 November 1966) was an Australian trade union official and politician.

Lawson was born in South Pine River, near Caboolture, Queensland, and educated at Warner State School. He fought in the Boer War in South Africa with the 5th (Queensland Imperial Bushmen) Contingent in 1901–02 and was mentioned in dispatches. He married Rebecca Jane Buchanan in 1907 and they had two sons but she died in 1918. In 1907, he helped found the Brisbane Trolleymen, Draymen and Carter's Union and was elected its secretary in 1908. The union later became the Carters and Drivers' Union and in 1912 he was elected its general secretary, a position he held for almost twenty years. He was president of the Trades and Labour Council of Queensland in 1924 and 1927. At the time of his election to the House of Representatives, he was secretary of the Road Transport Workers' Union.

Political career
Lawson was elected an alderman of the Windsor Town Council from 1916 to 1921 and appointed as an Australian Labor Party member of the Queensland Legislative Council in 1919, and helped bring about its abolition in 1922. He was elected the member for Brisbane in the Australian House of Representatives in the 1931 elections. In 1935 he married Kathleen Lally. With the election of the Curtin government in 1941 he became Minister for Transport, but lost his position in the ministry after the 1943 elections. After Labor's defeat in 1949 elections, he was a strong supporter of H. V. Evatt and opponent of both communists and groupers.

Lawson retired from parliament in 1961. He died at his home in the Brisbane suburb of Ashgrove in 1966 and was buried in Pinnaroo Cemetery.

Notes

External links

Australian Labor Party members of the Parliament of Australia
Members of the Australian House of Representatives for Brisbane
Members of the Australian House of Representatives
1880 births
1966 deaths
Members of the Cabinet of Australia
Members of the Queensland Legislative Council
Burials at Pinnaroo Cemetery, Brisbane
20th-century Australian politicians
Australian military personnel of the Second Boer War